Ash Grove Township is located in Shelby County, Illinois, USA. As of the 2010 census, its population was 479 and it contained 254 housing units.

History
Ash Grove was initially settled by Euro-Americans by 1830.  It was an early location of Mormon missionary activity in Illinois, with Mormons residing there by 1832.  In late 1836 a mob attacked a Mormon missionary preaching at Ash Grove.  Younger Green got an affidavit for the arrest of the mob, but the militia refused to cooperate in arresting the accused mobbers.

Geography

Adjacent townships 
 Whitley Township, Moultrie County (north)
 Mattoon Township, Coles County (northeast and east)
 Paradise Township, Coles County (east)
 Neoga Township, Cumberland County (east and southeast)
 Big Spring Township (south)
 Prairie Township (southwest)
 Richland Township (west)
 Windsor Township (northwest)

Demographics

References

External links
City-data.com
Illinois State Archives

Townships in Shelby County, Illinois
Populated places established in 1859
Townships in Illinois
1859 establishments in Illinois